"Fine Print" is a song by American singer-songwriter Nadia Ali. It was released on July 1, 2009 as the third single from Ali's debut solo album Embers by Smile in Bed Records.

Track listing

Charts

References

External links
'Fine Print' at iTunes

2009 singles
Nadia Ali (singer) songs
Songs written by Nadia Ali (singer)
2009 songs